Yukarıbudak is a village in the Çemişgezek District, Tunceli Province, Turkey. The village is populated by Kurds and had a population of 40 in 2021.

References 

Kurdish settlements in Tunceli Province
Villages in Çemişgezek District